Mount Shideler is a peak 1 mile (1.6 km) southeast of Mount Fitzsimmons in the north group of the Rockefeller Mountains on Edward VII Peninsula. Discovered on January 27, 1929, by members of the Byrd Antarctic Expedition on an exploratory flight over this area. The name appears to have been applied by the United States Antarctic Service (USAS) (1939–41).  Mount Shideler was named for Miami University geologist Dr. William H. Shideler.

Mountains of King Edward VII Land